Beauchamps-sur-Huillard is a commune in the Loiret department in north-central France.

Geography 
The commune of Beauchamps-sur-Huillard is located in the northeast quadrant of the Loiret department, in the agricultural region of Orléanais. It is located 40.8 km from Orléans, the prefecture of the department, 22.9 km from Montargis, the sub-prefecture, and 5.7 km from Bellegarde, the former capital of the canton on which the commune depended before March 2015. The commune is part of the Bellegard-Quiers-sur-Bézonde catchment area, from which it is 5.7 km away.

The closest communes are : Coudroy (3.6 km), Auvilliers-en-Gâtinais (4.6 km), Châtenoy (4.7 km), Bellegarde (5.7 km), Ouzouer-sous-Bellegarde (5.9 km), Vieilles-Maisons-sur-Joudry (6 km), Noyers (6.1 km), Quiers-sur-Bézonde (6.8 km), Chailly-en-Gâtinais (7 km) and Lorris (7.3 km).

Hydrography 
The Huillard and the Orleans canal cross the territory of the commune.

History 
Between January 29 and February 8, 1939, more than 2,800 Spanish refugees fleeing the collapse of the Spanish Republic in the face of Franco's troops arrived in the Loiret. Faced with inadequate infrastructure in Orléans, 46 rural reception centers were opened, including one in Beauchamps-sur-Huillard. The refugees, mainly women and children (the men were disarmed and held in the South of France), were subjected to strict quarantine, vaccinated, mail was limited, and supplies, although not very varied and cooked French-style, were nevertheless provided. Some of the refugees returned to Spain, encouraged by the French government, which facilitated the conditions of return, those who preferred to stay were grouped together at the Aydes glass factory camp in Fleury-les-Aubrais.

Population

See also
Communes of the Loiret department

References

Communes of Loiret